In mathematics, Stirling numbers arise in a variety of analytic and combinatorial problems. They are named after James Stirling, who introduced them in a purely algebraic setting in his book Methodus differentialis (1730). They were rediscovered and given a combinatorial meaning by Masanobu Saka in 1782.

Two different sets of numbers bear this name: the Stirling numbers of the first kind and the Stirling numbers of the second kind. Additionally, Lah numbers are sometimes referred to as Stirling numbers of the third kind.  Each kind is detailed in its respective article, this one serving as a description of relations between them.

A common property of all three kinds is that they describe coefficients relating three different sequences of polynomials that frequently arise in combinatorics.  Moreover, all three can be defined as the number of partitions of n elements into k non-empty subsets, with different ways of counting orderings within each subset.

Notation

Several different notations for Stirling numbers are in use. Common notation for ordinary (signed) Stirling numbers of the first kind is:

  
For unsigned Stirling numbers of the first kind, which count the number of permutations of n elements with k disjoint cycles, is:

 
And for Stirling numbers of the second kind, which count the number of ways to partition a set of n elements into k nonempty subsets:

 

For example, the sum  is the number of all permutations, while the sum  is the nth Bell number.

Abramowitz and Stegun use an uppercase  and a blackletter , respectively, for the first and second kinds of Stirling number.  The notation of brackets and braces, in analogy to binomial coefficients, was introduced in 1935 by Jovan Karamata and promoted later by Donald Knuth.  (The bracket notation conflicts with a common notation for Gaussian coefficients.)  The mathematical motivation for this type of notation, as well as additional Stirling number formulae, may be found on the page for Stirling numbers and exponential generating functions.

Expansions of falling and rising factorials
Stirling numbers express coefficients in expansions of falling and rising factorials (also known as the Pochhammer symbol) as polynomials.

with (signed) Stirling numbers of the first kind as coefficients.

Note that (x)0 = 1 because it is an empty product. (Confusingly, the Pochhammer symbol that many use for falling factorials is used in special functions for rising factorials.)

with unsigned Stirling numbers of the first kind as coefficients.
One of these expansions can be derived from the other by observing that .

Stirling numbers of the second kind express the reverse relations:

and

As change of basis coefficients
Considering the set of polynomials in the (indeterminate) variable x as a vector space,
each of the three sequences

is a basis.
That is, every polynomial in x can be written as a sum  for some unique coefficients  (similarly for the other two bases).
The above relations then express the change of basis between them, as summarized in the following commutative diagram:
 
The coefficients for the two bottom changes are described by the Lah numbers below.
Since coefficients in any basis are unique, one can define Stirling numbers this way, as the coefficients expressing polynomials of one basis in terms of another, that is, the unique numbers relating  with falling and rising factorials as above.

Falling factorials define, up to scaling, the same polynomials as binomial coefficients: . The changes between the standard basis  and the basis  are thus described by similar formulas:
 .

Example
Expressing a polynomial in the basis of falling factorials is useful for calculating sums of the polynomial evaluated at consecutive integers.
Indeed, the sum of falling factorials with fixed k can expressed as another falling factorial (for )

This can be proved by induction as

For example, the sum of fourth powers of integers up to n (this time with n included), is:

Here the Stirling numbers can be computed from their definition as the number of partitions of 4 elements into k non-empty unlabeled subsets.

In contrast, the sum  in the standard basis is given by Faulhaber's formula, which in general is more complex.

As inverse matrices
The Stirling numbers of the first and second kinds can be considered inverses of one another:

and

where  is the Kronecker delta. These two relationships may be understood to be matrix inverse relationships. That is, let s be the lower triangular matrix of Stirling numbers of the first kind, whose matrix elements

The inverse of this matrix is S, the lower triangular matrix of Stirling numbers of the second kind, whose entries are   Symbolically, this is written

Although s and S are infinite, so calculating a product entry involves an infinite sum, the matrix multiplications work because these matrices are lower triangular, so only a finite number of terms in the sum are nonzero.

Lah numbers

The Lah numbers  are sometimes called Stirling numbers of the third kind.

These numbers are coefficients expressing falling factorials in terms of rising factorials and vice versa:
 and 

In particular, one formula is the inverse of the other, thus:

 

In terms of matrices, if  denotes the matrix with entries  and  denotes the matrix with entries  , then one is the inverse of the other: .
Similarly, composing the matrix of unsigned Stirling numbers of the first kind with the matrix of Stirling numbers of the second kind gives the Lah numbers: .

The numbers  can be defined as the number of partitions of n elements into k non-empty unlabeled subsets, each of which is unordered, cyclically ordered, or linearly ordered, respectively. In particular, this implies the following inequalities:

Symmetric formulae

Abramowitz and Stegun give the following symmetric formulae that relate the Stirling numbers of the first and second kind.

and

Stirling numbers with negative integral values
The Stirling numbers can be extended to negative integral values, but not all authors do so in the same way. Regardless of the approach taken, it is worth noting that Stirling numbers of first and second kind are connected by the relations:

 

when n and k are nonnegative integers.  So we have the following table for :

Donald Knuth defined the more general Stirling numbers by extending a recurrence relation to all integers.
 

In this approach, one has the following extension of the recurrence relation of the Stirling numbers of the first kind:

,

For example, this produces .

See also
 Bell polynomials 
 Catalan number 
 Cycles and fixed points
 Lah number
 Pochhammer symbol
 Polynomial sequence
 Stirling transform
 Touchard polynomials
 Stirling permutation

Citations

References

Further reading
 
 
 
 
 
 
 
 
 
 
 
 
 
 
 

Permutations
Q-analogs
Factorial and binomial topics
Integer sequences